Anders Per-Johan Axelsson (born 26 February 1975), commonly abbreviated to P. J. Axelsson, is a Swedish former professional ice hockey forward, who most recently played with Frölunda HC of the Swedish Elitserien. His nickname in Sweden is "Pebben", while his nickname in Boston is “Potatoes”. He was the longest-tenured member of the NHL's Boston Bruins at the time of his departure from North American play in 2009, having been with the Boston team from 1997–2009.

Axelsson played as a left winger. Although he never gained the reputation of a premier goal scorer, Axelsson's gritty, unrelenting attitude as a solid, defensive-minded forward, and his ability to make smart plays on the ice made him a longtime fan favourite of the Boston Bruins, Frölunda HC, and the Swedish national team, Tre Kronor.

Playing career 

Axelsson played four seasons for his hometown team, Frölunda HC, in the Swedish Elitserien before being drafted 177th overall in the 1995 NHL Entry Draft by the Boston Bruins.

Axelsson played all 82 games in his rookie season with the Bruins, helping them to reach the playoffs after the Bruins had missed out the previous season. He was one of the Bruins' key skill players during his career with them.

During the 2004–05 NHL lockout, Axelsson played for Frölunda HC in Sweden and helped the team become the champion of Elitserien. After the lockout, he returned to the United States to rejoin the Bruins. He became an Olympic champion with Sweden at the 2006 Winter Olympics.

On 23 March 2006, he signed a three-year extension to his contract with the Boston Bruins.

On 21 February 2008, Axelsson played his 700th NHL game in Sunrise, Florida, a 5–4 shootout win over the Florida Panthers.

After helping the Bruins to the Eastern Conference semifinals during the 2008–09 NHL season, Axelsson signed a four-year contract with Frölunda HC on 27 July 2009. Upon his return, he was named as one of two alternate captains for the team.

On 10 April 2013, he announced his retirement from professional hockey. Axelsson was subsequently hired by the Bruins as a European amateur scout. He was partly responsible for the drafting by the Bruins of Swedish junior ice hockey defenseman Axel Andersson in the second round of the 2018 NHL Entry Draft as player #57 overall. By the time of the 2021 NHL off-season, Axelsson had become the Bruins' European scouting co-ordinator, helping his former NHL team select Swedish junior forward Fabian Lysell as the Bruins' top pick in the 2021 NHL Entry Draft.

Personal life 

Axelsson is married and has two children, a daughter named Wilma and a son named Wilson. During his spare time, he enjoys golf and football. His younger brother Anton Axelsson is also a professional ice hockey player.

Career achievements 

 Bronze medal at the Ice Hockey World Championships in 2001 and 2002.
 Silver medal at the Ice Hockey World Championships in 2003 and 2004.
 Elitserien champion with Frölunda HC in 2005.
 Gold medal at the Winter Olympics in 2006.
 Eddie Shore Award winner in 2006.

Records 

 Elitserien record for most assists in playoffs (10)

Career statistics

Regular season and playoffs

International

See also 

 list of NHL players who spent their entire career with one franchise

References

External links 

 
 

1975 births
Living people
Boston Bruins draft picks
Boston Bruins players
Boston Bruins scouts
Frölunda HC players
Ice hockey players at the 2002 Winter Olympics
Ice hockey players at the 2006 Winter Olympics
Medalists at the 2006 Winter Olympics
Olympic gold medalists for Sweden
Olympic ice hockey players of Sweden
Olympic medalists in ice hockey
People from Kungälv Municipality
Swedish expatriate ice hockey players in the United States
Swedish ice hockey left wingers
Sportspeople from Västra Götaland County